Inzer Bass Wyatt (March 29, 1907 – January 17, 1990) was a United States district judge of the United States District Court for the Southern District of New York.

Education and career

Born in Huntsville, Alabama, Wyatt received an Artium Baccalaureus degree from the University of Alabama in 1927 and a Bachelor of Laws from Harvard Law School in 1930. He was in private practice in New York City, New York from 1930 to 1941. He served as a colonel in the United States Army during World War II from 1942 to 1945. He returned to private practice in New York City from 1946 to 1962.

Federal judicial service

On July 5, 1962, Wyatt was nominated by President John F. Kennedy to a new seat on the United States District Court for the Southern District of New York created by 75 Stat. 80. He was confirmed by the United States Senate on September 20, 1962, and received his commission on September 28, 1962. He assumed senior status on March 29, 1977, serving in that capacity until his death on January 17, 1990, in New York City.

References

Sources
 

1907 births
1990 deaths
Lawyers from Huntsville, Alabama
Lawyers from New York City
Military personnel from Huntsville, Alabama
University of Alabama alumni
Harvard Law School alumni
Judges of the United States District Court for the Southern District of New York
United States district court judges appointed by John F. Kennedy
20th-century American judges
United States Army officers
20th-century American lawyers